Boryeong, commonly known as Daecheon, is a city in South Chungcheong Province, South Korea. It is located on the coast of the Yellow Sea. It lies on the Janghang Line railroad, which connects it to Seoul via the Gyeongbu Line. It is also connected to the Seohaean Expressway. Boryeong is known around Korea for its beaches, particularly Daecheon Beach, and its annual mud festival around July, Boryeong Mud Festival. The city's beach-mud is widely touted for its cosmetic properties. As elsewhere along the southwest coast of the Korean peninsula, there are numerous small islands, many of which are connected by ferry to Daecheon Port.

Boryeong gained its present boundaries in 1995, with the merger of Boryeong-gun and Daecheon City. Previously, the 2 entities were separated in 1986, and before that time had been united under the name Boryeong County (Boryeong-gun) since the Joseon Dynasty.

Overview
Boryeong public schools are operated by the Chungnam Office of Education. There are numerous schools in the Chungnam Province which includes the city of Boryeong. The city is commonly known as either Boryeong or Daecheon. One name is older. Daecheon Beach is located about three kilometers from Boryeong and is in the same province. There are numerous hotels throughout the area and an abundance of restaurants as well as PC cafes (internet access stations). The bus line which takes you from Boryeong to the beach is a public bus line. The two areas are about 3 to 12 kilometers apart, depending on your origination or destination point. The economy is diverse. Seafood is sold in the public market in Boryeong despite the rapid westernization that is occurring. Most of the produce vendors are elderly citizens. Consequently, the old and the new have collided in Boryeong, making it a wonderful example of "Dynamic Korea", the governments phrase to describe Korea in the 21st century. Most of the fresh produce and seafood vendors do not have shops, but set up on the sidewalks in front of other businesses. Thursdays are public market days.

In addition to Daecheon Beach, the Seongjusan National Forest is located in the Boryeong area. Visitors enter by taking a bus line or by driving to the entrance of Mt. Seongjusan. The Korean word for mountain is "san", so Seong-ju is a reference to the area near the mountain. Seongjusan is 677 m. in height and has a hiking trail that takes one from the visitor's parking area to the top and around and back again. The water is pure and unspoiled as there are no large domesticated animals living above the flow of the water, and the wooden spoon provided is used by all of the visitors alike.

There are a few Korean temples in this region, notably, Seodoksa, Muryangsa, and Goransa, "-sa" being the Korean word for temple. Goransa is in an unlikely location at the bottom of a steep hill near the Han River in the part of the Province that is famous as being the center of the Baekje Dynasty. To visit Goransa, you would arrive in the city of Buyeo by car or bus. Muryangsa can also be reached by car or bus. Seodoksa can be reached by car, bus, or train.

Daecheon Station is the train depot which was opened on December 21, 2007, replacing the old station (now closed) in downtown Boryeong. It can be reached by foot, by bus or by expressway. There is only one line going through Daecheon station, Janghang Line. Main stations this line goes through is Yongsan (Seoul), Cheonan, and Iksan. Millions of people use this line to get to Daecheon every year. There is also one expressway passing Daecheon. The Seohaean Expressway 15 runs from Seoul-Incheon through Boryeong and the other way to Mokpo.

Hodo Island is located a few kilometers off the coast of Boryeong and was vulnerable to the 2007 oil spill in Taean area to the north. Hundreds of volunteers have been working to improve the area and prevent the oil from returning to the sea by the tides. Many of the volunteers came from the public schools as a result of a direct appeal by the South Korean government relayed through the provincial school districts.

Climate

Sister cities
Boryeong is twinned with:
 Fujisawa, Japan
 Hangu (Tianjin), China
 Qingpu (Shanghai), China
 Shoreline, United States
 Takahama, Japan

Notable people
Yi Ji-ham (1517–1578), scholar and seer
Lee Mun-ku (1941-2003), novelist
Jun Tae-soo (1984–2018), actor
Yoon Bok-hee (b. 1946), singer-songwriter and musical actress
Kim Seong-Dong (b. 1947), author
Choi Si-han (b. 1952), writer, Korean literature scholar, and educator
Deok-Kyo Oh (b. 1952), theologian and politician
Lee Sun-hee (b. 1964), singer-songwriter
Nam Ki-won (b. 1966), para table tennis player and Olympic medalist
Park Jang-soon (b. 1968), freestyle wrestler, world champion and Olympic gold medalist
Nam Hee-suk (b. 1971), comedian and MC
Kim Tae-ho (b. 1975), television director
Lee Dae-hyung (b. 1983), baseball player
Park Solhee (b. 1990), writer

See also
 Administrative divisions of South Korea
 List of cities in South Korea

References

External links

Official website
Boryeong Mud Festival website 

 
Cities in South Chungcheong Province
Port cities and towns in South Korea